The Brenne is a  river in Côte-d'Or in Bourgogne, eastern France.

References

Rivers of France
Rivers of Côte-d'Or
Rivers of Bourgogne-Franche-Comté